The Professor Charles O. Denny House is a historic building located in Des Moines, Iowa, United States.   It is a 2½-story dwelling that follows an irregular plan. It features a hipped roof with gablets and additional gables, fishscale shingles, bargeboards, reeded panels that form the cornice, and a wraparound porch with a pedimented entry. The property on which it stands is one of ten plats that were owned by Drake University. The University sold the lot to C.O. Denny in 1892, and he had the house built the following year.  Denny was a Latin professor at Drake and lived nearby.  He seems to have bought the property for speculative purposes.  Its significance is attributed to the effect of the University's innovative financing techniques upon the settlement of the area around the campus.  The house was listed on the National Register of Historic Places in 1988.

References

Houses completed in 1893
Victorian architecture in Iowa
Houses in Des Moines, Iowa
National Register of Historic Places in Des Moines, Iowa
Houses on the National Register of Historic Places in Iowa